Ptilophora nohirae is a moth of the family Notodontidae. It is known from Japan, Korea and the Russian Far East.

The wingspan is 30–33 mm.

The larvae feed on Carpinus japonica.

External links
Japanese Moths

Notodontidae
Moths of Japan
Taxa named by Shōnen Matsumura